Jeremy The Remix  is the name of a remix album released by american singer Jeremy Jordan in 1993. The album was released in Japan only and includes remixes of three singles from the album Try My Love, which was released worldwide in 1993: "The Right Kind of Love", "Wannagirl" and "Try My Love". The album peaked #70 in the Oricon charts and sold 6,510 copies in Japan.

Track listing

source: Discogs

Charts

References 

1993 remix albums
Jeremy Jordan (singer, born 1973) albums